The 8th Empire Awards ceremony (officially known as the Sony Ericsson Empire Awards), presented by the British film magazine Empire, honored the best films of 2002 and took place on 5 February 2003 at The Dorchester Hotel in London, England. During the ceremony, Empire presented Empire Awards in nine categories as well as two honorary awards. The award for Sony Ericsson Scene of the Year was first introduced this year. The Best Debut award was renamed to "Best Newcomer". British actor Richard E. Grant hosted the show for the first time. The awards were sponsored by Sony Ericsson for the first time.

Minority Report won the most awards with three including Best Director for Steven Spielberg. Other winners included 28 Days Later, About a Boy, Die Another Day, Spider-Man, Star Wars: Episode II – Attack of the Clones and The Lord of the Rings: The Two Towers with one. Dustin Hoffman received the Lifetime Achievement Award and Michael Winterbottom and Andrew Eaton received the Independent Spirit Award for their role in the direction and production of 24 Hour Party People.

Winners and nominees
Winners are listed first and highlighted in boldface.

Multiple awards
The following film received multiple awards:

Multiple nominations
The following 11 films received multiple nominations:

References

External links
 
 

Empire Award ceremonies
2002 film awards
2003 in British cinema
2003 in London
February 2003 events in the United Kingdom
2000s in the City of Westminster